ARA La Argentina (pennant number D-11) is the second ship of the MEKO 360H2 series of four destroyers built for the Argentine Navy. The ship is the eighth ship in the history of the Argentine Navy to bear the name of the corsair frigate La Argentina which conducted a privateer raid around the world against Spanish trade in 1817.

Origin 
La Argentina and her sister ships were authorized under the Naval Construction National Plan of 1974, an initiative by the Argentine Navy to replace old World War II-vintage warships which were nearing the end of their operational lives. A contract was signed with the Blohm + Voss Shipyards in Hamburg, West Germany for the construction of four MEKO 360H2 destroyers.

Construction 
La Argentina  was launched on 25 September 1981. The ship was delivered to the Argentine Navy on 11 May 1983 for her sea trials, following which the ship departed for Argentina, arriving at Puerto Belgrano Naval Base on 18 July and being formally commissioned into the Navy on 4 August of that same year.

Service history 
The ship emerged in 2006 from an overhaul which included the extension of her flight deck to allow for the operation of SH-3 Sea King helicopters.

She is home-ported at Puerto Belgrano as part of the Navy's Destroyer Division, along with her three sister ships.

The Argentine Navy struggled to meet maintenance and training requirements because of financial problems and import restrictions. The Almirante Brown class were reported to be short of spares and suffering engine problems, plus all their ordnance was past its expiry date. As a result, La Argentina suffered a major breakdown in 2012.

On 30 June 2017, La Argentina accidentally collided with a jetty while departing Punta Alta Naval Base for an international naval exercise in the Pacific. The collision resulted in a gash in La Argentinas bow. She was quickly repaired, but while undergoing repairs, a fire broke out after an incident with welding equipment. Repairs were completed however, and La Argentina departed for Peru on 5 July 2017.

References

Bibliography
 Guia de los buques de la Armada Argentina 2005-2006. Ignacio Amendolara Bourdette, Editor n/a. (Spanish/English text)

 

Almirante Brown-class destroyers
Ships built in Hamburg
1981 ships
Destroyers of Argentina